This list of cemeteries in Louisiana includes currently operating, historical (closed for new interments), and defunct (graves abandoned or removed) cemeteries, columbaria, and mausolea which are historical and/or notable. It does not include pet cemeteries.

Acadia Parish 
 Istre Cemetery Grave Houses, Morse

Assumption Parish 
 Christ Episcopal Church and Cemetery, Napoleonville

Claiborne Parish 
 Old Town Cemetery, near Haynesville

East Baton Rouge Parish 
 Baton Rouge National Cemetery, Baton Rouge; NRHP-listed
 Magnolia Cemetery, Baton Rouge; NRHP-listed
 Port Hudson National Cemetery, Port Hudson; NRHP-listed

Jackson Parish 
 Brooklyn Church and Cemetery, Chatham; NRHP-listed

Natchitoches Parish 
 St. Augustine Catholic Church and Cemetery (also known as Isle Brevelle Church), Natchez

New Orleans 

 Girod Street Cemetery, New Orleans
 Greenwood Cemetery, New Orleans
 Holt Cemetery, New Orleans
 Lafayette Cemetery No. 1, New Orleans
 Metairie Cemetery, New Orleans; NRHP-listed
 Odd Fellows Rest Cemetery, New Orleans; NRHP-listed
 Saint Louis Cemetery, New Orleans; NRHP-listed
 Shrewsbury Cemetery (also known as Camp Parapet or First Zion Cemetery), New Orleans

Rapides Parish 
 Alexandria National Cemetery, Pineville; NRHP-listed
 Mt. Olivet Episcopal Church and Cemetery, Pineville
 Rapides Cemetery, Pineville; NRHP-listed

Saint Bernard Parish 
 Chalmette National Cemetery, Jean Lafitte National Historical Park and Preserve, Chalmette; NRHP-listed
 Freedmen's Cemetery, Chalmette (formerly part of New Orleans)

Tangipahoa Parish 
 Camp Moore Cemetery, Camp Moore, near Kentwood; NRHP-listed

Vermilion Parish 
 St. Mary Magdalen Church Cemetery, St. Mary Magdalen Church, Abbeville; NRHP-listed

Webster Parish 
 Minden Cemetery, Minden

West Feliciana Parish 
 Locust Grove State Historic Site (also known as Locust Grove Plantation Cemetery), near St. Francisville

See also
 List of cemeteries in the United States
 Tombstone tourist
 Jazz funeral

References

External links
 

Louisiana